Macy's, can refer to:
Macy's, Inc., formerly Federated Department Stores, Inc., parent company of Macy's (department store) and Bloomingdales
Macy's (department store), also known as R.H. Macy & Co.
Macy's West

See also
Macy (surname)